Steve, Steven or Stephen Evans may refer to:

Sports
 Steve Evans (baseball) (1885–1943), American baseball player
 Steve Evans (broadcaster) (1942–2000), American motorsports announcer
 Steve Evans (rugby league) (1957/58–2017), English rugby league footballer
 Steve Evans (footballer, born 1962),  Scottish football manager
 Stephen Evans (rower) (born 1962), Australian rower
 Steven Evans (cricketer) (born 1967), Sint Maartener cricketer
 Steve Evans (field hockey) (born 1976), South African field hockey player
 Steve Evans (footballer, born 1979), Welsh international footballer
 Stephen Evans (footballer) (born 1980), Welsh footballer with Carmarthen Town
 Steven Evans (soccer) (born 1991), American soccer player
 Steve Hunt (footballer, born 1956), English soccer player who changed his name to Evans after retirement

Other
 Stephen R. Evans (?–2017), politician, public administrator and author from Borneo
 Steve Evans (poet), Australian poet connected with Friendly Street Poets in Adelaide, South Australia
 C. Stephen Evans (born 1948), American philosopher
 Stephen Evans (scientist) (born before c.1950), British pharmacoepidemiologist and medical statistician
 Stephen Evans (diplomat) (born 1950), British High Commissioner to Bangladesh
 Stephen Evans (journalist) (born c. 1955), BBC correspondent
 Steven Neil Evans (born 1960), Australian-American statistician and mathematician
 Stephen C. Evans (born 1963), admiral in the United States Navy
 Steve Evans (writer) (born 1963), American journalist and film historian
 Stephen Evans (actor) (born 1970), British actor and writer
 Steve Evans (darts player) (born 1972), Welsh darts player

See also
 Stephen EvEns, both an alias of and a band formed by Stephen Gilchrist